The 2011 WWE draft was the ninth and final overall WWE draft before the WWE brand extension ended on August 29, produced by the American professional wrestling promotion WWE, which took place on April 25. With a core business of professional wrestling, the corporation held a draft to exchange personnel assigned to one of its two brands (Raw and SmackDown) that are (in terms of storyline) independent brands that represent WWE. The draft aired live on the USA Network on Raw in the United States for two hours in Raleigh, North Carolina from the RBC Center. As a standard for previous drafts, most on-air personnel were eligible to be drafted. A continuation of the draft took place on WWE's official website at 12:00pm Eastern time on the following afternoon.

Matches determined the recipient of draft picks for the television portion of the draft while the continuation of the draft via the Internet was conducted at random. The draft's 30 selections featured 29 wrestlers being exchanged between WWE's two brands. SmackDown received 16 additional members to its roster while Raw received 13. For the first time in draft history, two of the draft picks consisted of the same wrestler (John Cena) being selected to SmackDown with the first pick and back to Raw with the last televised pick.

Background
The Brand Extension storyline was initiated in March 2002, in which WWE's Raw and SmackDown television programs were made into brands (similar to conferences within a league) to which employees were assigned; the ECW brand was additionally involved between 2006 and 2009. Annual drafts have followed since this occurrence, except for in 2003. As with past drafts, the purpose of the 2011 WWE draft was to increase television ratings of WWE programming and refresh the rosters for each brand. The 2011 event was confirmed by the RBC Center in April 2011, with WWE officially announcing it on the April 18 episode of Raw. A USA Network executive had also confirmed the event to occur via a press release on the same day of the WWE announcement.

The 2011 WWE draft would mark the sixth time that only the Raw and SmackDown brands were involved; male and female wrestlers and other WWE personalities from these brands were eligible to be drafted. Unlike sports draft lotteries where players are signed to a team, WWE drafts feature on-air personnel being exchanged between brands. Like all other WWE programs, the draft was run by the WWE management backstage. Championships could be exchanged between brands if the champion was drafted, like with previous drafts; however, the WWE Divas Championship and WWE Tag Team Championship were accessible to both brands and thus had no role in the draft because of their inter-brand availability.

Roster selections
Overall, 29 wrestlers were drafted in 30 selections. Eight selections were made on television (four from each brand) with seven draftees; the online draft featured 22 selections (13 by Raw and nine by SmackDown). Of the 29 drafted personalities, only five were females (all drafted after the televised event). All but one of the draftees were in-ring competitors: Alberto Del Rio's personal ring announcer, Ricardo Rodriguez, came to Raw in the televised draft with Alberto Del Rio in one draft pick. SmackDown obtained the first draft pick by winning the first match, which resulted in the acquisition of John Cena. Raw obtained their first pick after winning the second match and were able to acquire Rey Mysterio. Cena became the second person to have changed brands twice during the same draft event (the first was Triple H in 2004, who was drafted to SmackDown then traded back to Raw), with Raw reacquiring Cena with the eighth draft pick to conclude the televised portion. Kelly Kelly became the first woman to be drafted overall and was drafted to the Smackdown brand. The draft also featured various wrestlers being selected to a new brand for the first time in their WWE careers, such as Sheamus and Daniel Bryan.

Televised draft
During Raw, matches were held among representatives of the two brands to determine which would receive one or two draft picks. Each match featured one or more wrestlers representing their brand; if a wrestler was drafted earlier in the program, they would represent their new brand. After the matches, a computerized system, which appeared on the Raw stage TitanTron, randomly selected a member from the opposing brand's roster for the winning brand. Unlike the regular Raw production, the lighting in the RBC Center featured red and blue lighting on the audience, like in WWE Superstars, and both programs' logos represented on the TitanTron.

Matches

Selections

Online draft
WWE announced that the draft would continue to take place over WWE.com on Tuesday, April 26, 2011, beginning at 12:00pm Eastern time.

Response and aftermath
Various WWE wrestlers posted updates on their Twitter accounts (as mentioned during the televised portion of the Draft) regarding their reactions to draft selections. Most of these regarded Raw losing top-tier talent to SmackDown, such as Cena and Orton switching brands. Mark Henry stated that with his recent weight loss, he was more determined to seek a championship reign on SmackDown. Rey Mysterio also was hopeful about his new home and explained that he would represent Raw just as proud as he has for the majority of his WWE career with SmackDown. The first and final pick in the televised event, John Cena, stated how he wanted to make history for 2011 and that it only begun by being the first person to ever be drafted officially first and last. Finally, Big Show was stunned by his selection but looked forward to the transition from broadcast delay to live television.

As a result of Sheamus holding the United States Championship, the title would be designated back to SmackDown (though the title would quickly go back to Raw due to Kofi Kingston's victory at Extreme Rules five nights later). Big Show being one half of the WWE Tag Team Champions allowed him to appear on both shows (as did his partner Kane), despite their brand designations. During the time that the Draft was produced, WWE was promoting their annual Extreme Rules pay-per-view event. At the time of production, the matches scheduled were between members of their respective rosters before the draft. These matches (including championships bouts) were scheduled to still take place while being official members to their new brands. As a result of the extra promotion, the April 25 episode of Raw increased viewership from the previous week in terms of adults from 1.6 and 1.7 to 2.0 and 1.9 for the first and second hours, respectively.

On the August 29 episode of Raw, it was announced that performers from Raw and SmackDown were no longer exclusive to their respective brand. Subsequentely, championships previously exclusive to one show or the other were available for wrestlers from any show to compete for; this would mark the end of the brand extension, as all programming and live events featured the full WWE roster. In a 2013 interview with Advertising Age, Stephanie McMahon explained that WWE's decision to end the brand extension was due to wanting their content to flow across television and online platforms. However, the brand split was reintroduced in July 2016, when SmackDown began broadcasting live on Tuesdays.

See also
History of WWE

Footnotes

References
General

Specific

External links
Official website
History of the WWE Draft

WWE Draft
WWE draft
April 2011 events in the United States
Events in Raleigh, North Carolina
Professional wrestling in Raleigh, North Carolina
2011 in North Carolina